KXZT is an American radio station licensed by the Federal Communications Commission (FCC) to broadcast at 107.9 MHz from Newell, South Dakota, covering the Rapid City and Black Hills area. On April 14, 2017 it went on air as a simulcast tower for KRKI. The tower is owned and operated by Bad Lands Broadcasting Company, Inc. KXZT serves the Northern Black Hills including Lead, Deadwood, Spearfish, Belle Fourche, and Sundance, WY.

External links 

XZT
Radio stations established in 2012
2012 establishments in South Dakota